Juan Pizarro y Alonso (born c. 1511 in Trujillo; died July 1536) was a Spanish conquistador who accompanied his brothers Francisco, Gonzalo and Hernando Pizarro for the conquest of Peru in 1532.

Biography
Juan Pizarro was the illegitimate son of Captain Gonzalo Pizarro y Rodríguez de Aguilar (senior) (1446–1522) and María Alonso, from Trujillo. His father was a colonel of infantry who had served with distinction in the Italian campaigns under Gonzalo Fernández de Córdoba, and in Navarre.  Juan Pizarro was the half brother of Francisco and Hernando Pizarro, and full brother to Gonzalo Pizarro.

Juan and his brothers, led by Francisco and friend Diego de Almagro, conquered the mighty Inca Empire in 1533. Juan, and Gonzalo Pizarro, were then appointed regidores on 24 March 1534, and garrisoned the city of Cuzco with ninety men, while Francisco Pizarro departed for Jauja.

In early Feb. 1536, two hundred thousand Incan warriors laid siege to the two hundred Spaniards in Cuzco.  Hernando, Gonzalo and Juan led the defense with counterattacks on the fortress overlooking the city.  Juan led the attack to recover the citadel.  Unable to wear a helmet (his jaw was swollen after being hit by a slingshot), Juan was struck in the head by a large stone and died a fortnight later.

Ancestors

Notes

References

1511 births
1536 deaths
People from Tierra de Trujillo
Extremaduran conquistadors
16th-century Spanish people
Spanish colonization of the Americas
Colonial Peru
Spanish military personnel killed in action
16th-century Peruvian people